The Dar al-Hajar ("Stone House" or "Rock Palace") is a former royal palace located in Wadi Dhar about  from Sana‘a, Yemen.  Built in the 1920s as the summer retreat of Yahya Muhammad Hamid ed-Din, ruler of Yemen from 1904 to 1948, it sits on top of a structure built in 1786 for the scholar al-Imam Mansour.  The palace stayed in the royal family until the Yemen revolution of 1962.  The palace is now a museum. In 1974, Pier Paolo Pasolini used the palace as the home of Princess Dunya in his film  The Arabian Nights.

See also 
 Dar al-Bashair
 Dar as-Sa'd
 Dar al-Shukr

References

External links 

Palaces in Yemen
Yemeni monarchy